Șantaj (Blackmail) is a Romanian film from 1981, screening of the novel Omul de la capătul firului by Rodica Ojog-Brașoveanu, directed by Geo Saizescu. The film stars Ileana Stana-Ionescu, Sebastian Papaiani, and Silviu Stănculescu in leading roles.

Plot 
A gang of forgers falsifying university degrees selects their clients from among young talented people, whom they help distinguish themselves, so that later, through blackmail, they can snatch their production secrets. However, Minerva Tutovan, a former math teacher turned major, manages to trick the gang, exposing their destructive tactics.

Full cast

References

1980s Romanian-language films